There are two species of northern right whale:
North Pacific right whale (Eubalaena japonica)
North Atlantic right whale (Eubalaena glacialis)

See also
Right whale